Neorautanenia is a genus of flowering plants in the legume family, Fabaceae. It belongs to the subfamily Faboideae. Neorautanenia mitis is a common perennial herb found in the middle-belt region of Nigeria, as well as other parts of western and central Africa. It has insecticidal properties and is used in traditional Rwandese medicine as treatment for scabies.

References 

Phaseoleae
Fabaceae genera